The demographics of Uzbekistan are the demographic features of the population of Uzbekistan, including population growth, population density, ethnicity, education level, health, economic status, religious affiliations, and other aspects of the population. The nationality of any person from Uzbekistan is Uzbekistani, while the ethnic Uzbek majority call themselves Uzbeks.  Much of the data is estimated because the last census was carried out in Soviet times in 1989.

Demographic trends

Uzbekistan is Central Asia's most populous country. Its 35 million people ( estimate) comprise nearly half the region's total population.

The population of Uzbekistan is very young: 25.1% of its people are younger than 14. According to official sources, Uzbeks comprise a majority (84.4%) of the total population. Other ethnic groups, as of 1996 estimates, include Russians (5.5% of the population), Tajiks (5%), Kazakhs (3%), Karakalpaks (2.5%), and Tatars (1.5%).
Uzbekistan has an ethnic Korean population that was forcibly relocated to the region from the Soviet Far East in 1937–1938. There are also small groups of Armenians in Uzbekistan, mostly in Tashkent and Samarkand. The nation is 94% Muslim (mostly Sunni), 3% Eastern Orthodox and 3% other faiths (which include small communities of Korean Christians, other Christian denominations, Buddhists, Baha'is, and more).  The Bukharan Jews have lived in Central Asia, mostly in Uzbekistan, for thousands of years. There were 94,900 Jews in Uzbekistan in 1989 (about 0.5% of the population according to the 1989 census), but now, since the collapse of the USSR, most Central Asian Jews left the region for the United States or Israel. More than 5,000 Jews remain in Uzbekistan.

Much of Uzbekistan's population was engaged in cotton farming in large-scale collective farms when the country was part of the Soviet Union. The population continues to be heavily rural and dependent on farming for its livelihood, although the farm structure in Uzbekistan has largely shifted from collective to individual since 1990.

Vital statistics

UN estimates

Source: United Nations, Department of Economic and Social Affairs website > World Population Prospects: The 2019 revision.

Sources:

Current vital statistics

Fertility and births
Total fertility rate (TFR) and crude birth rate (CBR):

Total fertility rate (TFR)

According to the CIA World Factbook, the total fertility rate (TFR) estimated as of 2011 is 1.89 children born/woman.

In 2002, the estimated TFR was 2.92; Uzbeks 2.99, Russians 1.35, Karakalpak 2.69, Tajik 3.19, Kazakh 2.95, Tatar 2.05, others 2.53; Tashkent City 1.96, Karakalpakstan 2.90, Fergana 2.73; Eastern region 2.71, East Central 2.96, Central 3.43, Western 3.05.

The high fertility rate during the Soviet Union and during its period of disintegration is partly due to the historical cultural preferences for large families, economic reliance upon agriculture, and the greater relative worth of Soviet child benefits in Uzbekistan. Abortion was the preferred method of birth control. Legalized in 1955, the number of abortions increased by 231% from 1956-1973. By 1991, the abortion ratio was 39 abortions per 1,000 women of reproductive age per year.

However, in the past few decades, fertility control methods have shifted considerably from abortion to modern contraceptive methods, especially IUDs. By the mid-1980s IUDS became the main method of contraception through government and organizational policies that aimed to introduce women to modern contraceptives. According to a UHES report from 2002, 73% of married Uzbek woman had used the IUD, 14% male condom, and 13% the pill.

The government supported the use of modern contraceptives to control fertility rates because of national economic difficulties that followed the disintegration of the Soviet Union. Thus the government has been influential in determining the popularity of the IUD. Despite family planning programs that educate women on different methods of contraception, the IUD has remained women’s first choice of contraception. Word of mouth and social relations also account for the strong preference for the IUD. Nevertheless, factors such as class and level of education have been shown to give women more freedom in their choice of contraception methods.

Regional differences 
The regions of Surxondaryo and Qashqadaryo have the highest birth rate and the lowest death rates in Uzbekistan. On the other hand, the city of Tashkent has the lowest birth rate and the highest death rate of the country.

Age structure
Population Estimates by Sex and Age Group (01.I.2020):

Life expectancy

Source: UN World Population Prospects 2017

Ethnic groups
Ethnic composition according to the 1989 population census (latest available):
Uzbek 71%, Russian 6%, Tajik 5% (believed to be much higher), Kazakh 4%, Tatar 3%, Karakalpak 2%, other 7%.

Estimates of ethnic composition in 1996 from CIA World Factbook:

Uzbek 80%, Russian 5.5%, Tajik 5%, Kazakh 3%, Karakalpak 2.5%, Tatar 1.5%, other 2.5% (1996 est.)

The table shows the ethnic composition of Uzbekistan's population (in percent) according to four population censuses between 1926 and 1989 (no population census was carried out in 1999, and the next census is now being planned for 2010). The increase in the percentage of Tajik from 3.9% of the population in 1979 to 4.7% in 1989 may be attributed, at least in part, to the change in census instructions: in the 1989 census for the first the nationality could be reported not according to the passport, but freely self-declared on the basis of the respondent's ethnic self-identification.

Languages

According to the CIA factbook, the current language distribution is: Uzbek 74.3%, Russian 14.2%, Tajik 4.4% and Other 7.1%. The Latin script replaced Cyrillic in the mid-1990s.
Following independence, Uzbek was made the official state language. President Islam Karimov, the radical nationalist group Birlik (Unity), and the Uzbek Popular Front promoted this change. These parties believed that Uzbek would stimulate nationalism and the change itself was part of the process of de-Russification, which was meant to deprive Russian language and culture of any recognition. Birlik held campaigns in the late 1980s to achieve this goal, with one event in 1989 culminating in 12,000 people in Tashkent calling for official recognition of Uzbek as the state language. In 1995, the government adopted the Law of the Republic of Uzbekistan on State Language, which mandates that Uzbek be used in all public spheres and official jobs. Scholars studying migration and ethnic minorities have since criticized the law as a source of discrimination toward minorities who do not speak Uzbek. Nevertheless, Russian remains the de facto language when it comes to science, inter-ethnic communication, business, and advertising.
Multiple sources suggest that the Persian-speaking Tajik population of Uzbekistan may be as large as 10%-15% of the total population. The Tajik language is the dominant language spoken in the cities of Bukhara and Samarkand. The delineation of territory in 1924 and the process of “Uzbekisation” caused many Tajiks to identify as Uzbek. Thus there are many Tajiks who speak Tajik but are officially documented as Uzbek.

Religion

Muslims constitute 94% of the population according to a 2013 US State Department release. Approximately 3% of the population are Russian Orthodox Christians.

There were 94,900 Jews in Uzbekistan in 1989 (about 0.5% of the population according to the 1989 census), but fewer than 5,000 remained in 2007.

A study showed that more than 50% of surveyed consider religion as "very important".

CIA World Factbook demographic statistics
The following demographic statistics are from the CIA World Factbook as of September 2009, unless otherwise indicated.

Age structure
2020 estimate:
0–14 years: 24%15–64 years: 60%65 years and over: 6%

Sex ratio
2009 estimate:
at birth: 1.06 male(s)/female
under 12 years 1.05 male(s)/female
15–64 years: 0.99 male(s)/female
65 years and over: 0.75 male(s)/female
total population: 0.99 male(s)/female

Infant mortality rate
2009 estimate:
Total: 23.43 deaths per 1,000 live births
Male: 27.7 deaths per 1,000 live births
Female: 18.9 deaths per 1,000 live births

Life expectancy at birth
2020 estimate:
total population: 75.2 years
male: 72.95 years
female: 78.15 years

Literacy
2003 estimate:
Literacy is defined as the percentage of the population aged 15 and over that can read and write.
total population: 99.3%
male: 99.6%
female: 99%

Education
The educational system has achieved 99% literacy, and the mean amount of schooling for both men and women is 12 years. The government provides free and compulsory 12-year education.

In 2016 Uzbekistan acknowledged the country's lack of higher education services to support its market needs. In addition, private higher education providers have begun to emerge on the market to provide students with the necessary knowledge and skills needed in the labor market. TEAM University, a private university in Tashkent, aims to develop the skills required to start entrepreneurial activities, thereby contributing to the development of businesses and private enterprises.

Migration
As of 2011, Uzbekistan has a net migration rate of -2.74 migrant(s)/ 1000 population.

The process of migration changed after the fall of the Soviet Union. During the Soviet Union, passports facilitated movement throughout the fifteen republics and movement throughout the republics was relatively less expensive than it is today. An application for a labor abroad permit from a special department of the Uzbek Agency of External Labor Migration in Uzbekistan is required since 2003. The permit was originally not affordable to many Uzbeks and the process was criticized for the bureaucratic red tape it required. The same departments and agencies involved in creating this permit are consequently working to substantially reduce the costs as well as simplifying the procedure. On July 4, 2007, the Russian First Deputy Prime Minister Sergey Ivanov signed three agreements that would address labor activity and protection of the rights of the working migrants (this includes Russian citizens in Uzbekistan and Uzbek citizens in Russia) as well as cooperation in fighting undocumented immigration and the deportation of undocumented workers.

Uzbek Migration
Economic difficulties have increased labor migration to Russia, Kazakhstan, the United Arab Emirates (UAE), Turkey, South Korea, and Europe over the past decade.  At least 10% of Uzbekistan’s labor force works abroad. Approximately 58% of the labor force that migrates, migrates to Russia. High unemployment rates and low wages are responsible for labor migration.

Migrants typically are people from the village, farmers, blue-collar workers, and students who are seeking work abroad. However, many migrants are not aware of the legal procedures required to leave the country, causing many to end up unregistered in Uzbekistan or the host country. Without proper registration, undocumented migrants are susceptible to underpayment, no social guarantees and bad treatment by employers. According to data from the Russian Federal Immigration Service, there were 102,658 officially registered labor migrants versus 1.5 million unregistered immigrants from Uzbekistan in Russia in 2006. The total remittances for both groups combined was approximately US $1.3 billion that same year, eight percent of Uzbekistan’s GDP.

Minorities

A significant number of ethnic and national minorities left Uzbekistan after the country became independent, but actual numbers are unknown. The primary reasons for migration by minorities include: few economic opportunities, a low standard of living, and a poor prospect for educational opportunities for future generations. Although Uzbekistan's language law has been cited as a source of discrimination toward those who do not speak Uzbek, this law has intertwined with social, economic, and political factors that have led to migration as a solution to a lack of opportunities in Uzbekistan.

Russians, who constituted a primarily urban population made up half of the population of Tashkent, the capital of Uzbekistan, until the 1980s. Since then, the population has been gradually diminishing as many Russians have migrated to Russia. Nevertheless, Russian registration permits (propiska) constrain migration. The decision to migrate is complicated by the fact that many Russians or other minority groups who have a “homeland” may view Uzbekistan as the “motherland.” It is also complicated by the fact that these groups might not speak the national language of their “homeland” or may be registered under another nationality on their passports. Nonetheless, “native” embassies facilitate this migration. Approximately 200 visas are given out to Jews from the Israel embassy weekly.

See also

 Demography of Central Asia

References